Penn Fraser Jillette (born March 5, 1955) is an American magician, actor, musician, inventor, television presenter, and author, best known for his work with fellow magician Teller as half of the team Penn & Teller. The duo has been featured in numerous stage and television shows, such as Penn & Teller: Fool Us and Penn & Teller: Bullshit!, and is currently headlining in Las Vegas at The Rio. Jillette serves as the act's orator and raconteur.

Jillette has published eight books, including the New York Times Bestseller, God, No!: Signs You May Already Be an Atheist and Other Magical Tales. He is also known for his advocacy of atheism, scientific skepticism, the First Amendment, as well as previously identifying as a libertarian, and supporting free-market capitalism.

Early life
Jillette was born in Greenfield, Massachusetts. His mother, Valda Rudolph Jillette (née Parks; 1909–2000), was a secretary, and his father, Samuel Herbert Jillette (1912–1999), worked at Greenfield's Franklin County Jail. Jillette became an atheist in his early teens after reading the Bible. He was subsequently asked to leave the church, after asking questions in a youth group that purportedly also made skeptics of his peers. Jillette became disenchanted with traditional illusionist acts that presented the craft as authentic magic, such as The Amazing Kreskin on The Tonight Show Starring Johnny Carson. At age eighteen, he saw a show by illusionist James Randi, and became enamored of his approach to magic that openly acknowledged deception as entertainment rather than a mysterious supernatural power. Jillette regularly acknowledges Randi as the one person on the planet he loved the most besides members of his family.

Jillette worked with high school classmate Michael Moschen in developing and performing a juggling act during the years immediately following their 1973 graduation. In 1973, Jillette graduated from Ringling Bros. and Barnum & Bailey Clown College. In 1974, he was introduced to Teller by Weir Chrisemer, a mutual friend. The three then formed a three-person act called Asparagus Valley Cultural Society which played in Amherst and San Francisco. In 1981, he and Teller teamed up as Penn & Teller, and went on to do a successful Off Broadway and later Broadway theatre show called "Penn & Teller" that toured nationally.

Career

Jillette served as host and presenter of the first touring performance by avant-garde band the Residents in 1983. The performance (titled The Mole Show and based on their "Mole trilogy" of albums) featured Jillette coming out between songs telling long and intentionally pointless stories. The show was designed to appear to fall apart as it progressed; Jillette pretended to grow angrier with the crowd, and lighting effects and music would become increasingly chaotic, all building up to the point where he was dragged off stage and returned, handcuffed to a wheelchair, to deliver his last monologue. During one performance, an audience member assaulted Jillette while he was handcuffed to the wheelchair. In later years, Jillette would contribute to two documentary films about the Residents.

Jillette was a contributor to the now-defunct PC/Computing magazine, having a regular back-section column between 1990 and 1994.

Jillette was the primary voice announcer for the U.S.-based cable network Comedy Central in the 1990s.

In 1994, Jillette purchased a house in the Las Vegas Valley and dubbed it "The Slammer".
It has been featured in dozens of television shows and articles and was designed by his friend Colin Summers. He formerly recorded music there, and conducted his radio show at the studio inside "The Slammer". In 2016, he sold "The Slammer" so that his family could move to a less remote location.

Starting in 1996, Jillette had a recurring role on Sabrina the Teenage Witch as Drell, the head of the Witches' Council. He and Teller both appeared in the pilot with Debbie Harry as the third member of the Council. The show was created by Jillette's friend Nell Scovell.

For a brief time in 1997, Jillette wrote bi-weekly dispatches for the search engine Excite.com. Each column ended with a pithy comment identifying which of the Penn & Teller duo he was. (For example: "Penn Jillette is the half of Penn & Teller that's detained at airports.") Jillette made a habit of linking many words in his online column to wacky sites that generally had nothing to do with the actual words. The columns are no longer available on the current Excite.com site, but have been republished with permission at PennAndTeller.com.

Starting in 2003, Jillette, along with Teller, began producing and hosting the show Penn & Teller: Bullshit! on Showtime. In the show, the two analyze cultural phenomena, debunk myths, criticize people and aspects of society they deem "bullshit".

In 2005 with actor Paul Provenza, Jillette co-produced and co-directed The Aristocrats, a documentary film tracing the life of an obscene joke known as "The Aristocrats". It principally consists of a variety of comedians telling their own versions of the joke.

From January 3, 2006, to March 2, 2007, Jillette hosted, along with fellow atheist, skeptic, and juggler Michael Goudeau, a live, hour-long radio talk show broadcast on Free FM. The show, Penn Radio, broadcast from his Vintage Nudes Studio in his Las Vegas home. The most notable recurring segment of the show was "Monkey Tuesday" and later "The Pull of the Weasel". On March 2, 2007, Jillette announced that he would no longer be doing his radio show. He stated that he is a "show biz wimp" and decided to stop doing the show so he could spend more time with his children.

During the 2006–07 television season, Jillette hosted the prime-time game show Identity on NBC.

In 2008, Jillette was a contestant on Dancing with the Stars, paired with professional dancer Kym Johnson. He was the first celebrity to be eliminated. A reference to his large feet as a sign of another large body part was censored in the West Coast airing.

During 2010–2011, Jillette did a bi-weekly show on Revision3 called Penn Point.

On August 16, 2011, Jillette's book God, No! Signs You May Already Be An Atheist and Other Magical Tales was released and made the New York Times Best Sellers shortly after, in the week of August 28, in the 14th position.

An avid upright bassist, Jillette frequently accompanies jazz pianist Mike Jones, who opens for the magician's Las Vegas show. On March 16, 2018, Jones released a live jazz album with Jillette entitled The Show Before the Show which consisted of ten tracks played by the duo at the Rio Las Vegas. Jillette additionally performed at the famed Green Mill Cocktail Lounge to coincide with the album's debut.

Jillette was one of the contestants on The Celebrity Apprentice season 5, beginning on February 19, 2012. He was fired from the show by Donald Trump during the Week 11 episode. Also on February 19, 2012, along with Michael Goudeau, he started the podcast Penn's Sunday School.

In 2013, he returned for the All-Star Celebrity Apprentice season, where he successfully made his way to the finale, raising $663,655 for the charity of his choice, Opportunity Village. On April 5, 2013, Penn and Teller were honored with a star on the Hollywood Walk of Fame in the live performance category. Their star, the 2,494th awarded, is near the star dedicated to Harry Houdini. The following day they were recognized by the Magic Castle with the "Magicians of the Year" award.

Penn credits magician and skeptical activist James Randi for his career. During an interview at TAM! 2012, Penn stated that "If not for Randi there would not be Penn & Teller as we are today." He went on to say that "Outside of my family... no one is more important in my life. Randi is everything to me."

Business ventures

50 Skidillion Watts
From 1987 to 1989, Jillette provided financial support to David and Jad Fair of the art rock band Half Japanese for their record label 50 Skidillion Watts. This allowed the band to release the albums Music to Strip By, The Band That Would Be King and Charmed Life. When asked about his assistance Jillette said, "anybody who listens to Half Jap becomes a fan."

Jill-Jet
In July 1999, Jillette was granted  for the "Jill-Jet", a hot-tub jet specially angled for allowing a woman to masturbate against the water stream. The patent expired in September 2018. He has credited Debbie Harry of Blondie for suggesting the idea, as the two of them were once in a hot tub and Harry made a remark about changing the jets for a woman's pleasure. Jillette liked the idea enough to pursue a patent application at the USPTO under the patent title "Hydro-therapeutic Stimulator".

The abstract of the patent explains that a "discharge nozzle is located within the tub and connected to the outlet, mounted to the seat so that the discharged water from the circulation pump automatically aligns with and is directed to stimulation points (e.g., the clitoris) of the female user when the female user sits in the seat." An article in the June 2006 issue of Playboy shed additional light on the invention. Originally, it was to be called the "ClitJet"; however, he stated that "Jill-Jet" was more suitable because it included his name in the title.

On the Penn Radio show, telling the listeners about the photo shoot for the Playboy article, Jillette mentioned that he has a Jill-Jet installed in a tub in his house, and that several of his female friends and friends' female spouses enjoy it a lot, but he is not aware of any other installations of a water jet in such a configuration anywhere else.

Vintage Nudes Studio
Jillette created a private recording studio in his Las Vegas home. The addition, designed by Outside The Lines Studio and built by Crisci Custom Builders between October 2003 and June 2004 as part of his Las Vegas home, was named Vintage Nudes Studios by Jillette for playing cards that he had collected. The cards are displayed in the interior design in a manner which is meaningful to magicians. The studio was home to Free FM's Penn Radio show, and was the home of the Penn's Sunday School stream and podcast until it was demolished in 2016, along with his former home, "The Slammer".

Personal life

Family
Jillette is married to Emily Jillette, and they have two children, Zolten and Moxie CrimeFighter.

Jillette has told multiple stories regarding the red fingernail on his left hand. In one, Jillette's mother told him to get a manicure because people would be looking at his hands. In response to this, he had all of his nails painted red as a joke. Jillette has also claimed that red fingernail provides excellent misdirection and is just plain cool.

In direct response to questions about his red fingernail, Penn has stated "People are asking about my fingernail. Wear my Dad's ring and my Mom's nail polish. Just for remembrance and respect." On the podcast Skepticality in 2012, Jillette said that he was considering changing the meaning of the red nail polish, telling one of his children it is for them. During his appearance on the Chopped Tournament of Stars (2014), he told the story of his mother suggesting he get a manicure for the reasons stated above, and said that he kept it out of respect for her.

Health
Jillette says that he has an addictive personality and claims to have never had "so much as a puff of marijuana or a drop of alcohol" because he does not trust himself to do it in moderation.

In December 2014, Jillette's blood pressure caused him to be admitted to the hospital. By his birthday, March 5, 2015, he had lost . He follows Joel Fuhrman's nutritarian diet, which means that he eats little or no animal products, no processed grains, and no added sugar or salt. Penn is featured in Eating You Alive, a 2016 American documentary about food and health.  In an interview with Big Think in 2020, Jillette said he is a vegan.

Atheism

Jillette identifies as an atheist. His cars' license plates read "ATHEIST", "NOGOD" and "GODLESS". "Strangely enough, they wouldn't give me 'INFIDEL,'" he said.

In 2005, he wrote and read an essay for National Public Radio claiming that he was "beyond atheism. Atheism is not believing in God... I believe there is no God." His atheism, he has explained, has informed every aspect of his life and thoughts, and as such is as crucial to him as theistic beliefs are to the devout. Jillette encourages open discussion, debate, and proselytizing on the issue of God's existence, believing that the issue is too important for opinions about it to remain private. Jillette does not dismiss all who do believe in God: in a 2008 edition of his Penn Says podcast, he expresses his appreciation for a fan who brought him the gift of a pocket Gideon Bible after a performance because he realized that this individual sincerely cared enough about him to try to help him.

In January 2007, Jillette took the "Blasphemy Challenge" offered by the Rational Response Squad and publicly denied the existence of a holy spirit.

Jillette appeared in the 2019 Church of the SubGenius film J.R. ‘Bob’ Dobbs and the Church of the SubGenius, where he spoke positively of the parody religion.

Politics
Jillette has previously identified as a libertarian, and stated in 2003 that he may consider himself an anarcho-capitalist. He was a fellow at the libertarian think tank the Cato Institute.

In 2008, Jillette stated that there is not enough information to make an informed decision on global warming, that his gut told him it was not real, but his mind said that he cannot prove it. As of 2014, he has changed his position and now believes that climate change is occurring.

He stated in 2008 that he "always" votes Libertarian, 
and endorsed Libertarian Party nominee Gary Johnson for President in 2012 and 2016. However, he participated in vote swapping in 2016 by voting for Democratic nominee Hillary Clinton in the swing state of Nevada, in exchange for "10 or 11" of his friends promising to vote for Johnson in blue states like California and New York.

In 2020, Jillette distanced himself from aspects of libertarianism, particularly surrounding COVID-19. In an interview with Big Think, he stated, "[A] lot of the illusions that I held dear, rugged individualism, individual freedoms, are coming back to bite us in the ass." He went on to elaborate, "[I]t seems like getting rid of the gatekeepers gave us Trump as president, and in the same breath, in the same wind, gave us not wearing masks, and maybe gave us a huge unpleasant amount of overt racism."

In the 2020 United States presidential election, Jillette endorsed Andrew Yang in the Democratic primary. In an op-ed for CNN after that year's general election, he stated that he "used to identify as Libertarian", but voted for Joe Biden.

Appearances

Filmography 
 Savage Island (1985)
 Off Beat (1985)
 My Chauffeur  (1986)
 Tough Guys Don't Dance (1987)
 Invisible Thread (1987)
 Gandahar (1988)
 Penn & Teller Get Killed (1989)
 Half Japanese – The Band That Would Be King (1991)
 The Residents: Twenty Twisted Questions (1992)
 Car 54, Where Are You? (1994)
 Hackers (1995)
 Toy Story (1995) – Buzz Lightyear TV commercial announcer
 Fear and Loathing in Las Vegas (1998)
 Fantasia 2000 (1999) – Himself
 Michael Moore Hates America (2004)
 The Aristocrats (2005)
 ¡Mucha Lucha!: The Return of El Maléfico – Himself, Fortune Teller, Ticket Man, Pawn Shop Owner (2005)
 The Growth (2009)
 Futurama: Into the Wild Green Yonder (2009)
 Tim's Vermeer (2013) – Himself
 An Honest Liar (2014)
 Theory of Obscurity: a film about The Residents (2015)
 Sharknado 3: Oh Hell No (2015)
 Director's Cut (2016)
 The Grounds (2016)
 J.R. ‘Bob’ Dobbs and the Church of the SubGenius (2019) – Himself

Television
 Penn & Teller Go Public (1985) TV program produced by Community Television of Southern California and aired on Public Television stations.
 Miami Vice
 The Prodigal Son (1985) TV episode ... Jimmy Borges
 Lois & Clark: The New Adventures of Superman
 Illusions of Grandeur (1 episode, 1994) ... Darrin Romick
 VR.5
 Pilot (1 episode, 1995) ... Mr. Orwell Kravitz
 Space Ghost Coast to Coast
 $20.01 (1 episode, 1996) ... Himself
 Friends
 The One with the Cuffs (1 episode, 1997) ... Encyclopedia Salesman
 The Drew Carey Show
 See Drew Run (1997) TV episode ... Archibald Fenn
 Drew Meets Lawyers (1995) TV episode ... Archibald Fenn
 Sabrina the Teenage Witch
 First Kiss (1997) TV episode .... Drell
 Jenny's Non-Dream (1997) TV episode ... Drell
 Terrible Things (1996) TV episode ... Drell
 Pilot (1996) TV episode ... Drell
 Nightmare Ned
 Lucky Abe (1997) TV episode ... Frank Grimes
 Babylon 5
 Day of the Dead (1998) TV episode ... Rebo
 Penn & Teller's Sin City Spectacular 1998–99
 Hollywood Squares (1998–2004) regular
 The Simpsons
 Hello Gutter, Hello Fadder
 The Great Simpsina (2 episodes, 1999, 2011) ... himself
 Dharma & Greg (2001)
 Just Shoot Me
 The Proposal, Part 2 (2001) TV episode ... Terry
 The West Wing
 In the Room (2004) ... himself
 Penn & Teller: Bullshit! (2003–2010)
 The Moxy Show (original voice of Flea; later replaced by an unidentified actor in some episodes)
 Identity (2006–2007)
 Real Time with Bill Maher (2006) TV episode ... himself
 World Series of Poker (2006)
 Dancing with the Stars (2008) ... himself
 Numb3rs
 Magic Show (2008) TV episode ... himself
 Glenn Beck (Fox News)
 Handy Manny
 Halloween/Squeeze's Magic Show (2008) TV episode ... Magic Marty
 The Defenders
 Whitten v. Fenlee (2010) TV episode ... Ruben Charters
 Fetch! with Ruff Ruffman
 You Can't Teach an Orange Dog New Tricks (2009) TV episode...Himself
 Penn & Teller: Fool Us (35+ episodes, 2011, 2015–) 
 Real Time with Bill Maher (October 14, 2011) TV episode ... himself
 Penn & Teller Tell a Lie (2011)
 Celebrity Apprentice 5 (2012)
 All-Star Celebrity Apprentice (2013)
 In Bed With Joan (2013) ... guest
 Rachael vs. Guy: Celebrity Cook-Off (2014)
 Chopped Tournament of Stars (2014)
 Wizard Wars (2014)
 Celebrity Wife Swap (2014) (July 1, 2014) TV episode ... himself
 Alpha House season 2 (2014) several TV episodes ... fictionalized version of himself
 Camp Stew (2014) ... hosting as himself
 Hell's Kitchen (2014) ... himself
 Penn Jillette's Street Cred (1+ episodes, 2014–) ... himself
 Deal with It episode 3.7 (2014) ... himself
 Modern Family season 6 (2015)
 King of the Nerds (2015) ... himself
 Celebrity Jeopardy (2015) ... himself
 Whose Line Is It Anyway? (July 6, 2015) TV episode ... He and Teller appeared as special guests
 Scorpion (2016) episodes 2.16, 2.17, 3.19 and 4.20 ... Dr. Cecil P. Rizzuto
 Billions, episode 1x02: Naming Rights (2016) ... himself
 The Eric Andre Show Season 4 (2016) ... himself
 Code Black Season 2 (2016) ... Johnny Prentiss
 Black Mirror, episode "Black Museum" (2017), credited with story idea based on Jillette's "The Pain Addict"
 The Late Show with Ewen Cameron (2017) ... himself with Teller
 Crashing (TV series) Season 2, Episode 1 (2018) ... himself
 The Grand Tour (2018) Series 2, Episode 9 ... himself with Teller
 Ridiculousness (2019) Season 13, Episode 27 ... himself
 Scooby-Doo and Guess Who?  (2019) Season 1, Episode 8 ... himself with Teller
 The Masked Singer (2022) ... Hydra, himself with Teller
 Britain's Got Talent: The Ultimate Magician (2022) … Judge, Himself

Video games 
 Penn & Teller's Smoke and Mirrors (unreleased) ... Himself
 Steven Spielberg's Director's Chair (1996) ... Himself
 Borderlands 3 (2019) ... Pain (Voice/Appearance)
 Penn & Teller VR: Frankly Unfair, Unkind, Unnecessary & Underhanded (2019) ... Himself

Music videos
 Penn Jillette – "Clay Aiken" by Penn Jillette
 Katy Perry – "Waking Up in Vegas"
 Ramones – "Something to Believe In"
 Rascal Flatts – "Why Wait"
 Run–D.M.C. – "It's Tricky"
 Too Much Joy – "Donna Everywhere"

Music
 Ralph Records 10th Anniversary Radio Special! (1982) by Various / Penn Jillette
 Captain Howdy, a band which consisted of Jillette and Mark Kramer, released:
 The Best Song Ever Written (single, 1993)
 Tattoo of Blood (album, 1994)
 Money Feeds My Music Machine (album, 1997)
 Bongos, Bass and Bob, a band which consisted of Jillette, Rob Elk and Dean J. Seal, released:
 Never Mind the Sex Pistols, Here's Bongos Bass and Bob! (What on Earth Were They Thinking?) (album, 1988)
 The Horse You Rode In On by Pigface
 The Show Before the Show, a live jazz duo recording performed by Jillette and pianist Mike Jones at the Rio Las Vegas (album, 2018)

Bibliography

Podcasts
Penn Radio (January 2006 – March 2007), radioshow that was also podcasted
Penn Says (January 2008 – April 2010), videolog on Crackle.com
Penn Point (May 2010 – October 2011), videolog on Revision3.com
Penn's Sunday School (February 2012 – present) at pennsundayschool.com

References

External links

 
 
 
 

1955 births
Living people
20th-century atheists
21st-century American male writers
21st-century American novelists
21st-century atheists
American anarcho-capitalists
American atheism activists
American atheist writers
American game show hosts
American humanists
American libertarians
American magicians
American male film actors
American male television actors
American male voice actors
American male novelists
American podcasters
American skeptics
American talk radio hosts
Cato Institute people
Critics of alternative medicine
Critics of creationism
Jugglers
Judges in American reality television series
People from Greenfield, Massachusetts
Pigface members
The Apprentice (franchise) contestants
Writers about religion and science
Writers from Massachusetts